Marty or Martin Russo may refer to:
Marty Russo (born 1944), American politician
Martin P. Russo (born 1968), American attorney